New British Poetry is a 2004 poetry anthology edited by Scots poet Don Paterson and American poet Charles Simic.

In his preface, Simic wrote: "To make it as current as possible, Don Paterson and I decided to include only poets born after 1945 who have had at least two books published. Aside from that constraint, our plan was simply to read a lot of poetry and pick out poems we like."

In a review of the book, Zachariah Wells writes that the editors "favour taste over tact, to exclude work from that school of opaque hermeticism known variously as 'experimental,' 'postmodern' or 'avant-garde' poetry. This is a conscious decision, made explicit by Paterson [...]"

Paterson, in his "passionately opinionated" introduction, has a defense of mainstream poetry:

The work of the Postmoderns delegates the production of meaning to the reader, their poetry being largely derelict in its responsibility to aid it. The reader is alone. For those of us quickly bored by our own company, the result is work that can be objectively described as extremely boring.

Poets included
The volume includes work from 36 poets from England, Scotland, and Wales (not Northern Ireland):

Gillian Allnutt 
Simon Armitage 
John Ash 
Sujata Bhatt 
John Burnside 
Robert Crawford 
Fred D'Aguiar 
Peter Didsbury 

Michael Donaghy 
Carol Ann Duffy 
Ian Duhig 
Paul Farley 
James Fenton 
Mark Ford 
John Glenday 

Lavinia Greenlaw 
W. N. Herbert 
Selima Hill 
Michael Hofmann 
Kathleen Jamie 
Alan Jenkins 
Jackie Kay 

Gwyneth Lewis 
Roddy Lumsden 
Glyn Maxwell 
Jamie McKendrick 
Andrew Motion 
Sean O'Brien 
Alice Oswald 

Ruth Padel 
Don Paterson 
Peter Reading 
Christopher Reid 
Robin Robertson 
Anne Rouse 
Jo Shapcott

Other information
 (paperback)

256 pages

See also
 2004 in poetry
 The New British Poetry a 1988 anthology

Notes

External links
  Graywolf Press Web page on the book

Reviews
  Review of the book by Zach Wells at The Danforth Review (Canadian)

2004 poetry books
New British Poetry (2004)